Thomas George Baring, 1st Earl of Northbrook,  (22 January 182615 November 1904) was a British Liberal statesman. Gladstone appointed him Governor-General of India 1872–1876. His major accomplishments came as an energetic reformer who was dedicated to upgrading the quality of government in the British Raj. He reduced taxes and overcame bureaucratic obstacles in an effort to reduce both starvation and widespread social unrest. He served as First Lord of the Admiralty between 1880 and 1885.

Background and education
Northbrook was the eldest son of Francis Baring, 1st Baron Northbrook, by his first wife Jane, daughter of the Sir George Grey, 1st Baronet. Jane died when young Thomas was less than thirteen, and he studied under a tutor, Mr. Bird, at home and took an interest in natural history. At fourteen Thomas wrote to his father who was holidaying at Weymouth to capture a yellow butterfly with black spots at the end of each wing known to be found on Portland Island. He was sent briefly to another tutor, Mr. Vaughan Johnson at Chalons-sur-Marne, to study French. He also took an interest in sketching, learning from S. Palmer, and later his friend Edward Lear. He went to Christ Church, Oxford in 1843, and graduated with honours in 1846. He travelled in Europe and took an interest in mountaineering, joining his friend from Oxford, Alfred Seymour.

Political career
Northbrook entered upon a political career, and was successively private secretary to Henry Labouchere (Board of Trade), Sir George Grey (Home Office), and Sir Charles Wood (India Office and then Admiralty to 1857). In 1847 he served on the committee of the British Relief Association. In 1857, he was returned to the House of Commons for Penryn and Falmouth, which he represented until becoming a peer on the death of his father in 1866. He served under Lord Palmerston as Civil Lord of the Admiralty between 1857 and 1858, as Under-Secretary of State for War in 1861, as Under-Secretary of State for India between 1861 and 1864, under Palmerston and Lord Russell as Under-Secretary of State for the Home Department between 1864 and 1866 and under Russell as Secretary to the Admiralty in 1866.

When William Ewart Gladstone acceded to power in 1868, Baring was again appointed Under-Secretary of State for War, and this office he held until February 1872, when he was appointed Viceroy of India. On 3 May he was Knight Grand Commander of the Order of the Star of India and ex officio Grand Master of the Order.

In January 1876, however, he resigned. He had recommended the conclusion of arrangements with Sher Ali Khan which, as has since been admitted, would have prevented the Second Anglo-Afghan War; but his policy was overruled by the Duke of Argyll, then Secretary of State for India. in 1876 he was created Viscount Baring, of Lee in the County of Kent, and Earl of Northbrook, in the County of Southampton.

From 1880 to 1885 Northbrook held the post of First Lord of the Admiralty in Gladstone's second government. During his tenure of office the state of the navy aroused much public anxiety and led to a strong agitation in favor of an extended shipbuilding programme. The agitation called forth Tennyson's poem The Fleet. In September 1884, Northbrook was sent to Egypt as special commissioner to inquire into its finances and condition. The inquiry was largely unnecessary, all the essential facts being well known, but the mission was a device of Gladstone's to avoid an immediate decision on a perplexing question. Northbrook, after six weeks of inquiry in Egypt, sent in two reports, one general, advising against the withdrawal of the British garrison, and one financial. His financial proposals, if accepted, would have substituted the financial control of Britain for the international control proposed at the London Conference of June–August of the same year, but this was not carried out. When Gladstone formed his third ministry in 1886 Baring held aloof, being opposed to the Home Rule policy of the prime minister; and he then ceased to take a prominent part in political life.

Other work

Baring had served in the Hampshire Yeomanry, reaching the rank of major, and was appointed the regiment's Honorary Colonel on 26 January 1889.

In 1890 he was appointed Lord Lieutenant of Hampshire.

In the 1880s he was president of an offshoot of the National Indian Association, which was named the Northbrook Indian Society after its president. From 1890 to 1893 he was president of the Royal Asiatic Society.

In 1898 he sold the land of Manor House Gardens, to the London County Council, and also gifted land in Lee to public use, which was opened as Northbrook Park in 1903.

He was elected a Fellow of the Royal Botanic Society in November 1902.

Family

Lord Northbrook married Elizabeth, daughter of Henry Charles Sturt and sister of Lord Alington, in 1848. They had two sons and one daughter. She died in June 1867, aged 40. Lord Northbrook remained a widower until his death at Stratton Park, Hampshire, in November 1904, aged 78. There is a memorial to him at All Saints, East Stratton. He was succeeded in the earldom by his eldest son, Francis.

Legacy in India
The Ghanta Ghar Multan, or Clock Tower of Multan, was named 'Northbrook Tower'. It is located in the center of Multan in Punjab province, Pakistan. A library named 'Northbrook Hall' is located in Dhaka, capital of Bangladesh.

See also
Northbrook Hall
Manor House Gardens

References

Further reading
 
 Mersey, Viscount Charles Clive Bigham. The viceroys and governors-general of India, 1757-1947 (1949)
 , includes his speeches

External links

 

1826 births
1904 deaths
People educated at Twyford School
Alumni of Christ Church, Oxford
Earls in the Peerage of the United Kingdom
Fellows of the Royal Society
Knights Grand Commander of the Order of the Star of India
Baring, Thomas
Lord-Lieutenants of Hampshire
First Lords of the Admiralty
Baring, Thomas
Baring, Thomas
Baring, Thomas
Baring, Thomas
Northbrook, E1
UK MPs who were granted peerages
Members of the Privy Council of the United Kingdom
Thomas
Viceroys of India
1870s in British India
Presidents of the Royal Asiatic Society
Presidents of the Royal Geographical Society
Liberal Party (UK) hereditary peers
Liberal Unionist Party peers
Northbrook
Eldest sons of British hereditary barons
Lords of the Admiralty